Thomas or Tom(my) Dean or Deen may refer to:
Thomas Dean (cricketer, born 1920) (1920–2004), English cricketer
Tom Dean (Gloucestershire cricketer) (1881–1964), cricketer who played once for Gloucestershire in 1908
Tom Dean (artist), Canadian conceptual artist
Tommy Dean (born 1945), shortstop in Major League Baseball
Thomas Dean (computer scientist), professor at Brown University and researcher at Google
Tom Dean (swimmer) (born 2000), British swimmer
Tom Dean (basketball), see Morgan State Bears men's basketball
Tommy Dean (comedian), American-Australian comedian who appeared on Stand Up Australia
Thomas Dean (mechanic), see Henkes Islands
Thomas B. Deen, see List of members of the National Academy of Engineering

See also

Thomas Deane (disambiguation)
Tommy Deans, Scottish footballer
Dean Thomas (disambiguation)